Janus van der Zande (16 September 1924 – 7 August 2016) was a Dutch marathon runner who competed in the 1952 Summer Olympics. He was born in  Halsteren.

References

1924 births
2016 deaths
Athletes (track and field) at the 1952 Summer Olympics
Dutch male marathon runners
Olympic athletes of the Netherlands
Sportspeople from Bergen op Zoom